Utkal Sangeet Mahavidyalaya is a performing arts-cum-educational institution in Bhubaneswar, Odisha, India.

History and Accreditation 
Utkal Sangeet Mahavidyalaya was established by former Chief minister of Odisha Biju Patnaik on 14 April 1964, under Administrative Control of Odisha Sangeet Natak Academi (OSNA) till 1981. Then, from 1981 to 1999 it was affiliated to Utkal University.

Presently, Higher secondary course of this institution affiliated to CHSE, Odisha and Bachelor's and Master's Degree are affiliated to Utkal University of Culture since 1999.

Academics
It has several departments in the performing arts that students can choose to pursue, such as dance, drama, classical vocal, different musical instruments.
 Department of Vocal Music
 Department of Instrumental Music
 Department of Dance
 Department of Drama

It offers 7 years of education and training, and includes a two year Higher Secondary School Certificate, a three year Bachelor of Arts, and a two year Master of Arts. Students are educated in the liberal arts and the performing arts at the same time. The Mahavidyalaya has been home to several luminaries in the world of Odissi music and Odissi dance over its history, both as its faculty and alumni.

Notable faculty
Odissi music

 Singhari Shyamsundar Kar
 Markandeya Mahapatra
 Nrusingha Nath Khuntia
 Balakrushna Dash
 Gopal Chandra Panda
 Bhikari Charan Bal
 Ramhari Das
 Bijaya Kumar Jena

Odissi Mardala

 Banamali Maharana
 Mahadev Rout

Odissi dance

 Pankaj Charan Das
 Deba Prasad Das

Notable alumni

Hara Patnaik
Raimohan Parida
Ashrumochan Mohanty
Harihara Mohapatra
Subodh Patnaik (Theatre director)
Rituraj Mohanty
Jyoti Rout
Gangadhar Pradhan
Choudhury Bikash Das
Vaswati Basu
Durga Charan Ranbir
Ramhari Das
Sneha Samantray

Gallery

During Golden Jubilee Celebration
On completing 50 years, the music school celebrated its Golden jubilee for five days in 2014. Around 1,200 participants and folk art groups of the state including Students, alumni, former and present faculty and staff members of Utkal Sangeet Mahavidyalaya participated in the golden jubilee celebrations. Celebrated by walking from Sachivalaya Marg to Ekamra Haat and then back to the college.

See also
 Utkal University
 Utkal University of Culture
 Sangeet Natak Akademi
 National School of Drama

References

Odisha
Music schools in India
Universities and colleges in Bhubaneswar
1964 establishments in Orissa
Educational institutions established in 1964
Odia culture
Odissi music